The 20th Golden Bell Awards was held on 24 March 1985 at the Sun Yat-sen Memorial Hall in Taipei, Taiwan. The ceremony was broadcast by China Television (CTV).

Winners

References

1985
1985 in Taiwan